Causus bilineatus is a viper species endemic to south central Africa. No subspecies are currently recognized. Common names include lined night adder, two-lined night adder, and two-striped night adder. Like all other vipers, it is venomous.

Description

The head is slightly distinct from the neck, while the snout is fairly long and tapering. Midbody there are 15–18 rows of dorsal scales that are weakly keeled and have a soft and velvety appearance. The ventral scales number 122–141 in males and 128–144 in females. There are 18–30 subcaudals.

The color pattern consists of an ash to auburn to brown ground color, overlaid with numerous irregular or vaguely rectangular black dorsal patches. These patches lie within two distinct and narrow pale stripes that run the length of the body. The belly color is dark to dark cream.

Geographic range
Causus bilineatus is found in Angola, Zambia, southern DR Congo, Rwanda, and western Tanzania.

The type locality is given by Boulenger (1905) as "between Benguella and Bihé" (Angola). Bocage (1895) listed "Duque de Bragança, Quissange, Caconda, and Huilla" (Angola) for the localities.

Habitat
Occurs in moist savanna, forest-savanna environments, and swampy habitats. Wild-caught specimens found to have eaten clawed frogs, Xenopus, suggest a more aquatic nature than other species.

Feeding
Preys mostly upon toads and frogs, particularly the clawed frog, Xenopus.

References

Further reading
Bocage, J.V.B. du. 1895. Herpétologie d'Angola et du Congo. Ministère de la Marine et des Colonies. (Imprimerie National, printer.) Lisbon. xx + 203 pp. + Plates I-XIX. (Causus rhombeatus, part, p. 146.)
Boulenger, G.A. 1905. A List of the Batrachians and Reptiles collected by Dr. W.J. Ansorge in Angola, with Descriptions of new Species. Ann. Mag. Nat. Hist., Seventh Series 16: 105-1156. (Causus rhombeatus var. bilineatus, p. 114.)

bilineatus
Snakes of Africa
Reptiles of Angola
Reptiles of the Democratic Republic of the Congo
Vertebrates of Rwanda
Reptiles of Tanzania
Reptiles of Zambia
Reptiles described in 1905
Taxa named by George Albert Boulenger